La Vaca or Techovita is a small wetland, part of the Wetlands of Bogotá, located in the locality Kennedy, Bogotá, Colombia. La Vaca is close to the Avenidad Ciudad de Cali.

Etymology 
The alternative name Techovita was the name of a cacique in the Muisca Confederation, the former country on the Altiplano Cundiboyacense before the Spanish conquest.

See also 

Biodiversity of Colombia, Bogotá savanna, Thomas van der Hammen Natural Reserve
Wetlands of Bogotá

References

Bibliography

Further reading

External links 
  Fundación Humedales de Bogotá
  Conozca los 15 humedales de Bogotá - El Tiempo

Wetlands of Bogotá